The 1958 Arizona State–Flagstaff Lumberjacks football team was an American football team that represented Arizona State College at Flagstaff (now known as Northern Arizona University) in the Frontier Conference during the 1958 NAIA football season. In their third year under head coach Max Spilsbury, the Lumberjacks compiled an 11–1 record, won the Frontier Conference championship, and outscored opponents by a total of 321 to 98. They lost to  Northeastern State for the NAIA championship in the 1958 Holiday Bowl. 

The team played its home games at Lumberjack Stadium in Flagstaff, Arizona.

Schedule

References

Arizona State-Flagstaff
Northern Arizona Lumberjacks football seasons
Arizona State-Flagstaff Lumberjacks football